Muhammad Afzal Khan Dhandla (born 15 January 1964) is a Pakistani politician who had been a member of the National Assembly of Pakistan, from June 2013 to May 2018.

Early life
He was born on 15 January 1964.

Political career
He ran for the seat of the National Assembly of Pakistan as a candidate of Pakistan Muslim League (N) (PML-N) from Constituency NA-74 (Bhakkar-II) in 2002 Pakistani general election but was unsuccessful. He received 71,607 votes and lost the seat to Shujaat Hussain.

He ran for the seat of the National Assembly as a candidate of PML-N from Constituency NA-74 (Bhakkar-II) in 2008 Pakistani general election but was unsuccessful. He received 86,688 votes and lost the seat to Rashid Akbar Khan.

He was elected to the National Assembly as an independent candidate from Constituency NA-74 (Bhakkar-II) in 2013 Pakistani general election. He received 118,196 votes and defeated an independent candidate, Ahmad Nawaz Khan. He joined PML-N in May 2013. During his tenure as Member of the National Assembly, he served as the Federal Parliamentary Secretary for Interior and Narcotics Control.

In May 2018, he quit PML-N and joined Pakistan Tehreek-e-Insaf (PTI).

 
He won 2018 Pakistani general election from NA-98 (Bhakkar-II) obtaining 1,38,307 votes. In 2022, during the no-confidence motion against Imran Khan, he voted against his party chairman.

See also
 List of members of the 15th National Assembly of Pakistan

References

External Link
 

Living people
1964 births
Pakistan Muslim League (N) politicians
Pakistani MNAs 2013–2018